Pontius de Cruce, also Pons of the Cross, was a Master of the Templars.

Andrew II of Hungary was extremely favorably disposed towards the Templars. During his participation in the Fifth Crusade he appointed Pontius de Cruce, Master of the Order in the Hungarian Kingdom, as a regent in Croatia and Dalmatia.

References

Footnotes

Bibliography 

Medieval Knights Templar members
13th-century Hungarian nobility